Fuyu–Nenjiang railway or Funen railway, is a single-track railroad in northeastern China between Fuyu and Nenjiang in Heilongjiang Province. Major towns along route include Fuyu, Nehe, and Nenjiang.

Line description
In the south, the Funen railway begins in Fuyu as a fork off of the Qiqihar–Bei'an railway.  It proceeds northeast along the Nen River valley to Nehe and then to Nenjiang, where the Nenjiang–Greater Khingan Forest (Nenlin) railway heads northwest to Inner Mongolia and the Nenjiang–Heibaoshan railway branches northeast to Heibaoshan. In recent years, the Funen and Nenlin railroads have been collectively referred to as the Fuyu West (Fuxi) railway.

History
Construction of the Fuyu-Nenjiang began in 1930 when northeastern China was ruled by the Republic of China.  When the Fuyu to Laha section was completed in 1932, the region had fallen to Japan and was nominally ruled by Manchukuo.  In August 1945, the Soviet Union entered World War II in the Pacific Theater and drove Japan from Manchuria.  In April 1946, the retreating Soviet Red Army removed the rail line.  In November of that year, the Chinese Communists' Northeast Regional Bureau mobilized 27,898 laborers and 14,311 wagons and had the line rebuilt.  The line was originally called the Ningnian–Nenjiang railway and took on its current name after Ningnian was renamed Fuyu.

Rail connections
Nenjiang: Nenjiang–Greater Khingan Forest Railway
Fuyu: Qiqihar–Bei'an Railway

See also

 List of railways in China

References

Railway lines in China
Rail transport in Heilongjiang